Adichunchanagiri, also called Mahasamsthana Math, is a hill township in Nagamangala Taluk, Mandya District, Karnataka State, India, 110 km west of Bangalore, the capital of Karnataka, India and 6 km from Bangalore-Mangalore National Highway 48, northerly to Bellur cross. Sri Adichunchanagiri Mahasamsthana Math is situated on a rocky hill at an altitude of about 3,300 ft. above M.s.l. It is the spiritual headquarters of the  Natha Parampare and Jogi Cult of Hindus of Karnataka.

Kalabhairaveshwara Temple
Sri Kalabhairaveshwara is the Kshetra Palaka of Sri Adichunchanagiri Mahasamsthana Math. Lord Gangadhareshwara is the presiding deity. The Pancha Lingas, the Jwala Peetha, Sthambamba are all held in great reverence by the devotees. The peak point of the Giri (hillock) is known as Akasha Bhairava and the sacred pond by the temple is Bindu Sarovara. Two lakes have been built for the deepostava programmes. The old Bindu Sarovara was also renovated as per agama tradition.

Folklore
The Shivapurana, inscriptions and the folklore have references to this Kshetra. Legends say that AdiRudra handed over this Kshethra to Siddha Yogi who established the Siddha Simhasana and the Math. The present head, Sri Sri Sri Nirmalanandanatha Swamiji is the 72nd head of this Mutt. Swamiji became the head of the Mutt in 2013. The Mutt grew rapidly under the 71st pontiff jagadguru padma bhushan  Sri Sri Sri Dr. Balagangadharanatha Swamiji who headed the mutt from 1974 to 2013.

References

External links 

 Official Website of Adhichunchangiri Mahasamsthana Math
 

Hindu temples in Mandya district
Hindu monasteries in India
Geography of Mandya district
Tourist attractions in Mandya district
Cities and towns in Mandya district
Hills of Karnataka